Kacper Stelmach (born 5 May 1997) is a Polish volleyball player, a member of Polish club GKS Katowice.

Personal life
His father Andrzej is former Olympic volleyball player, six time Polish Champion. Also his uncle Krzysztof is former Olympic volleyball player, long-time member of Polish national team. He is studying economic analytics at University of Economics in Katowice.

Career
His debuted in PlusLiga in 2015 as AZS Częstochowa player. He didn't have many chance to play in main squad so he decided to move to GKS Katowice.

References

External links
 PlusLiga player profile

1997 births
Living people
Polish men's volleyball players
AZS Częstochowa players
Place of birth missing (living people)